Rhaphigaster nebulosa, common name mottled shieldbug, is a species of stink bugs in the family Pentatomidae. It is the only species of the genus Rhaphigaster.

Distribution
This species is distributed throughout the Palearctic region, more commonly in the southern than in the northern parts of Central Europe (Austria, Croatia, France, Germany, Greece, Hungary, Italy, Luxembourg, Serbia, Slovenia, Spain, Switzerland, Turkey, United Kingdom), and is not known to occur in the United States.

Habitat
Mottled shieldbugs prefer warm deciduous forests, parks and gardens.

Description
These large shieldbugs are hairless and coloured dirty yellowish-grey to brown with irregularly-distributed fovea on the top side of its body. The membrane of the forewings is often speckled dark brown, although these speckles are quite variable in extent. The lateral edge (Connexivum) of the abdomen has black and yellow markings. The antennae are ringed with black and yellow markings on the 3rd to 5th segments. The underside of the body is light coloured and shows dark spots. On its underside, between the hips (on the 1st sternite), there is a long spur. This species is similar to Dolycoris baccarum, but it lacks hairs.

Biology
These polyphagous bugs feed on plant juices of a wide range of broadleaved woody plants, such as hawthorn (Crataegus), plum (Prunus), hazel (Corylus), whitebeam (Sorbus) and elm (Ulmus), but they may also feed on various shrubs, on hedges (blackberry), and on creepers (ivy). Occasionally they suck the body fluids on dead insects.

In late spring, the female sticks around 40 eggs in lines or discs on different parts of plants. The young that hatch vary in colour and are flightless. Wing stumps are only recognisable after the third nymph stage. To protect against predators, young bugs have stink glands on their back; in the case of adults, these are to be found on the underside of the thorax. If threatened, a strong-smelling secretion is released. Adults can be found all year. They are not good fliers; their sluggish flight makes loud humming noises.

This species displays diurnal, thermophilic activity. As with most Pentatomidae, it produces only one generation per year. It likes to overwinter on walls covered with ivy. In its search for suitable winter quarters (splits and cracks) it often unwittingly finds its way into houses.

This species produces a plethora of eggs when disturbed in its habitat. Angering or threatening the bug makes it produce an off-white colored secretion that can be harmful if swallowed. Chemicals in the secretion allow the eggs to continue to fertilize in any environment, even those that are highly acidic or basic.

Gallery

References

Ekkehard Wachmann: "Wanzen beobachten - kennenlernen." J. Neumann - Neudamm, Melsungen, 1989. 

Pentatomidae
Insects described in 1761
Hemiptera of Europe
Taxa named by Nikolaus Poda von Neuhaus